Events from the year 1333 in the Kingdom of Scotland.

Incumbents
 Monarch – David II

Events
 25 March – Battle of Dornock
 19 July – Battle of Halidon Hill results in decisive English victory

Deaths 
 19 July – Sir Archibald Douglas, killed at Battle of Halidon Hill
 19 July – William IV, Lord of Douglas, killed at Battle of Halidon Hill
 19 July – Hugh, Earl of Ross, killed at Battle of Halidon Hill 
 19 July – Maol Choluim II, Earl of Lennox, killed at Battle of Halidon Hill
 19 July – Alexander de Brus, Earl of Carrick, killed at Battle of Halidon Hill
 19 July – Kenneth de Moravia, 4th Earl of Sutherland, killed at Battle of Halidon Hill
 19 July – Alan Stewart of Dreghorn, killed at Battle of Halidon Hill
 19 July – John Campbell, Earl of Atholl, killed at Battle of Halidon Hill

See also

 Timeline of Scottish history

References

 
Years of the 14th century in Scotland
Wars of Scottish Independence